The Rainforest of Xishuangbanna in the Yunnan Province of China is one of the largest forests in Asia at .

In recent years the region has been opened up to use in a large scale and the primary forests, especially rainforests, have been severely destroyed.

Biodiversity 
Xishuangbanna is included in the Indo-Burma biodiversity hotspots and contains over 5,000 species of vascular plants, comprising 16% of China’s total plant diversity.

This rainforest entails also a very diverse fauna of birds, mammals, and reptiles, and amphibians, which represent 36%, 21%, and 14% of China’s biodiversity, respectively.

Among others, the area gives home to Asian elephants, Indo-Chinese tigers, and green peacocks.

Vegetation types 
The tropical rainforest of Xishuangbanna can be divided into two vegetation subtypes pertaining to tropical rainforest vegetation, the tropical seasonal rainforest and the tropical montane rainforest.

References 

Forests of China